Frank Caldwell may refer to:
 Frank Caldwell (British Army officer)
 Frank W. Caldwell, American propeller engineer and designer
 Frank Merrill Caldwell, United States Army general
 James F. Caldwell Jr., known as Frank, United States Navy admiral

See also
 Francis Caldwell, British police officer 
 Francis Xavier Caldwell, businessman and political figure in Upper Canada